Jan Bens (15 April 1921 – 12 May 2012) was a Dutch professional football player and coach; he was also an amateur boxer and trainer.

Football career

Playing career
Born in Rotterdam, Bens joined hometown club Feyenoord at the age of 12 and made his senior debut at the age of 17. In a match against Ajax on 6 December 1942, Bens became the first player ever to be sent off in De Klassieker, after punching Ajax goalkeeper Gerrit Keizer. A winger, scored 25 goals in 76 first team games for Feyenoord. In 2007, he was the last surviving Feyenoord player from before World War II.

He left Feyenoord for EBOH in 1947.

Managerial career
After retiring as a player, Bens became a manager and coach, working in both the Netherlands and Australia with Go Ahead Eagles, EBOH, DFC, SC Cambuur, Ringwood City Wilhelmina and SVV.

Boxing career
Bens had a career as an amateur boxer, alongside his football career. He also trained professional boxer Lolle van Houten.

Later life and death
Bens died on 12 May 2012, at the age of 91.

References

1921 births
2012 deaths
Footballers from Rotterdam
Dutch footballers
Association football wingers
Feyenoord players
EBOH players
Dutch football managers
FC Dordrecht managers
SC Cambuur managers
SV SVV managers
Dutch male boxers